Jesse M. Campbell (born October 9, 1977 in Twinsburg, Ohio) is an American Thoroughbred horse racing jockey who earned the biggest win of his career on July 7, 2013 in the $1 million Queen's Plate aboard Midnight Aria at Woodbine Racetrack in Toronto, Ontario. He is also the regular rider of 2016 Canadian Horse of the Year Caren.

The son of trainer Michael Campbell, Jesse has a twin brother, Joel, who is also a jockey. 

Jesse Campbell began his professional riding career in 1995, winning his first race on July 20 at Arlington Park in Chicago.  In 2011, Campbell made his homebase at Woodbine Racetrack and tied for tenth place in the jockey standings during his first season in which he won sixty races. On October 19, 2012, Campbell won five races on a single card at Woodbine Racetrack. 

On October 23, 2016, Campbell won two stakes races at Woodbine on the same card despite staying up the night before watching the Chicago Cubs earn a place in the World Series.  "This means so much because I grew up a Cubs fans going to games at Wrigley. I’m a Northsider for sure."

Year-end charts

References

1977 births
Living people
American jockeys
People from Twinsburg, Ohio